The Vermont Maple Sugar Makers' Association (VMSMA), founded in 1893, is one of the oldest non-government agricultural organization in the United States. The organization is headquartered at Westford in the U.S. state of Vermont.

Mission
The Vermont Maple Sugar Makers' Association mission is to safeguard the tradition of maple sugarmaking while maintaining the highest standards of production and product quality. The VMSMA works with local maple sugarmakers, the Vermont sugarmakers, the Vermont Agency of Agriculture Food and Markets, the United States Department of Agriculture, and international agencies and non-government organizations to protect the integrity and purity of maple syrup.

The VMSMA educates consumers by providing information on how maple syrup is made, its nutritional value, how to cook with it, and promotes visits to sugar houses where the public can watch maple syrup being made. As maple sugarmaking is intertwined with Vermont's culture and history the VMSMA works with its related organization, the non-profit Vermont Maple Foundation to provide demonstrations, arranges visits and events, and presents the story of Vermont maple sugarmaking.

See also
 List of foods made from maple

External links

Organizations established in 1893
History of Vermont
Agriculture in Vermont
Organizations based in Vermont
Windsor County, Vermont
Sugar organizations
Agricultural organizations based in the United States
1893 establishments in Vermont